Caloboletus kluzakii is a bolete fungus native to Europe. Until 2014, it was known as Boletus kluzakii. Recent changes in the phylogenetic framework of the family Boletaceae prompted the transfer of this species, along with several other related boletes, including Caloboletus calopus, to the genus Caloboletus. It was described scientifically in 2006 by Josef Šutara and Pavel Špinar, from specimens collected in the Czech Republic. The fungus had earlier been published with the name Boletus fallax by Czech mycologist Zdeněk Kluzák in 1988, but this was invalid, as that name had been used previously by E.J.H. Corner for a Malaysian bolete (later transferred to the genus Boletellus as  Boletellus fallax). The epithet honours Kluzák's contributions in describing the species.

References

External links

kluzakii
Fungi described in 2006
Fungi of Europe